Albert Joseph Vande Weghe (July 28, 1916 – August 13, 2002) was an American competition swimmer and Olympic silver medalist.

As a 20-year-old high school senior at the 1936 Summer Olympics in Berlin, Germany, he won the silver medal in the men's 100-meter backstroke.  Vande Weghe finished second behind fellow American Adolph Kiefer and recorded a time of 1:07.7.  Like Kiefer, Vande Weghe never achieved his full potential as a swimmer after his competition career was interrupted by military service during World War II.

He was known for being the first man to swim the 100-yard backstroke in under a minute, and for the competitive advantage he gained in the turn by inventing the flip turn.

After the Olympics, Vande Weghe attended Princeton University, where he swam for the Princeton Tigers swimming and diving team.
He swam for four years without ever losing a college dual meet, and won the NCAA national championship in the 150-yard backstroke three consecutive years.  He graduated from Princeton with a bachelor's degree in chemical engineering in 1940.

Vande Weghe was inducted into the International Swimming Hall of Fame as an "Honor Swimmer" in 1990.

See also
 List of members of the International Swimming Hall of Fame
 List of Olympic medalists in swimming (men)
 List of Princeton University Olympians
 List of Princeton University people

References

1916 births
2002 deaths
American male backstroke swimmers
American military personnel of World War II
American people of Flemish descent
American people of Dutch descent
Olympic silver medalists for the United States in swimming
Princeton Tigers men's swimmers
Sportspeople from New York City
Swimmers at the 1936 Summer Olympics
Medalists at the 1936 Summer Olympics
20th-century American people
21st-century American people